Rasbora trilineata is a species of ray-finned fish in the genus Rasbora. Common names include scissortail rasbora and three-lined rasbora. It comes from Southeast Asia. Its length is up to 15 cm (6").

Aquarium
In the wild, Rasbora trilineata is an omnivore. It adapts easily to normal aquarium foods.

References 

Fish of Thailand
Rasboras
Fish of the Mekong Basin
Fish of Cambodia
Freshwater fish of Indonesia
Fish of Laos
Freshwater fish of Malaysia
Fish of Vietnam
Taxa named by Franz Steindachner
Fish described in 1870